is a passenger railway station in the city of Shibukawa, Gunma Prefecture, Japan, operated by East Japan Railway Company (JR East).

Lines
Ubashima Station is a station on the Agatsuma Line, and is located 7.7 rail kilometers from the terminus of the line at Shibukawa Station.

Station layout
The station consists of a single side platform. The station is unattended.

History
Ubashima Station was opened on 10 February 1959. The station was absorbed into the JR East network upon the privatization of the Japanese National Railways (JNR) on 1 April 1987.

Surrounding area
 Agatsuma River

External links

 JR East Station information 

Railway stations in Gunma Prefecture
Agatsuma Line
Stations of East Japan Railway Company
Railway stations in Japan opened in 1959
Shibukawa, Gunma